Designated Rivals is a remix album by Tinfed, released on Attinuator Records.

Track listing

Personnel 
Adapted from the Designated Rivals liner notes.
Tinfed
 Matt McCord – drums, percussion
 Rey Osburn – lead vocals, electric guitar, electronics
 Eric Stenman – electric guitar, bass guitar
 Rick Verrett – bass guitar

Release history

References

External links 
 Designated Rivals at Discogs (list of releases)

2003 remix albums
Tinfed albums